Ajjenahalli, Alur  is a village in the southern state of Karnataka, India. It is located in the Alur taluk of Hassan district in Karnataka. Ajjenahalli is 12 km (7.5 mi) away from Hassan District, 19 km (12 mi) away from Mananthavadi.

History
Ajjenahalli is a village that has a history dating back to the early 7th century, with the relics of Danteshwara and Varadaraja of Srirangapatna having been found in the area. The Taluk office of Hassan is located at Ajjenahalli.

See also
 Hassan
 Districts of Karnataka

References

External links
 http://Hassan.nic.in/

Villages in Hassan district